Lieutenant General Sir Charles Macpherson Dobell  (22 June 1869 – 17 October 1954) was a Canadian soldier who served with the Royal Welch Fusiliers of the British Army.

Career
Born in Quebec City, the son of Richard Reid Dobell, an MP, and a grandson of Senator Sir David Lewis Macpherson, Dobell was educated at the Rev. Canon Von Iffland's Private School, the Quebec High School and Charterhouse School in England. He graduated from the Royal Military College of Canada (college #221) in 1890. He was a lieutenant in the Hazara expedition of 1891 and took part with the International Forces in the occupation of the Island of Crete, where he was promoted to major. He served during the Second Boer War, where he was awarded the Distinguished Service Order. After serving in Nigeria, he was promoted to lieutenant colonel. He served in China during the Boxer Rebellion. He was gazetted as Inspector-General of the West African Field Force, with the rank of brigadier general.

During the First World War, he fought in the Kamerun campaign and was later promoted to lieutenant general. He served with the Egyptian Expeditionary Force in the Sinai and Palestine Campaign under General Sir Archibald Murray, but they were both replaced in 1917.

In the 1915 New Year Honours, he was made a Companion of the Order of St Michael and St George. He was also made a Knight Commander of the Order of the Bath.

Footnotes

References
 
 Biography of Charles Dobell at firstworldwar.com

Books
4237 Dr. Adrian Preston & Peter Dennis (Edited) "Swords and Covenants" Rowman And Littlefield, London. Croom Helm. 1976.
H16511 Dr. Richard Arthur Preston "To Serve Canada: A History of the Royal Military College of Canada" 1997 Toronto, University of Toronto Press, 1969.
H16511 Dr. Richard Arthur Preston "Canada's RMC – A History of Royal Military College" Second Edition 1982
H16511 Dr. Richard Preston "R.M.C. and Kingston: The effect of imperial and military influences on a Canadian community" 1968 Kingston, Ontario.
H1877 R. Guy C. Smith (editor) "As You Were! Ex-Cadets Remember". In 2 Volumes. Volume I: 1876–1918. Volume II: 1919–1984. RMC. Kingston, Ontario. The R.M.C. Club of Canada. 1984
 Winston S. Churchill "Ian Hamilton's March" Longmans, Green, and Co, London (1 edition) 1900, page 405.

1869 births
1954 deaths
People educated at Charterhouse School
British Army personnel of the Second Boer War
British Army generals of World War I
Companions of the Distinguished Service Order
Companions of the Order of St Michael and St George
Canadian Knights Commander of the Order of the Bath
Royal Military College of Canada alumni
Royal Welch Fusiliers officers
British Army personnel of the Boxer Rebellion
Canadian military personnel from Quebec
British Army lieutenant generals